Ban Kradon station is a railway station located in Nong Khai Nam Subdistrict, Mueang Nakhon Ratchasima District, Nakhon Ratchasima Province. The station was originally a railway halt. It was upgraded to a railway station and rebuilt in 2019 as part of the double tracking project between Thanon Chira Junction and Khon Kaen.

References 

Railway stations in Thailand
Nakhon Ratchasima province